Unmasked is the eighth studio album by American hard rock band Kiss, released on May 20, 1980. It was their first not to feature drummer Peter Criss (although largely absent from the preceding Dynasty, Criss performed on that album's "Dirty Livin'"). Despite having no involvement in its production, Criss features in the album's artwork and appears in the video for "Shandi".

Overview
The album features substantial contributions from producer Vini Poncia, who had been Ringo Starr's post-Beatles songwriting partner. All tracks bar Ace Frehley's "Talk to Me" and "Two Sides of the Coin" were written or co-written by someone outside the band. Anton Fig is the drummer on all songs, and six out of 11 songs feature only one member of the band Kiss: Ace Frehley performs all guitars, bass and vocals on his three songs, Paul Stanley does the same on "Tomorrow" and "Easy as it Seems", and on "Shandi", Stanley and Fig are joined by Tom Harper on bass. 

A promotional video for "Shandi" proved Criss's final performance with Kiss until a cameo at a Kiss Convention on June 17, 1995. In the band's authorized biography, the drummer revealed that he was the last one in the band's dressing room after filming and he broke down crying. The album cover and poster insert, designed by artist Victor Stabin, featured a winking Criss. "Unmasked was like the tail end of a comet," reflected Stanley, "and I don't mean Frehley's."

A lip-synched German television performance of "Talk to Me" and "She's So European" featured the debut of Eric Carr, who became the band's permanent drummer until he died in 1991. The band played a single concert in the US to officially introduce Carr as Criss's replacement at the Palladium Theatre in New York City. Kiss then toured Europe and Australia (where their popularity was at an all-time high) and played "Is That You?", "Talk to Me", "Shandi" and for a short time, "You're All That I Want". Otherwise, the album's songs have been largely ignored in following live performances, bar "Shandi", which is sometimes played, particularly in Australia (where the song became a top ten hit in 1980). "Talk to Me" was played in 2001 during Australian and Japanese legs of the Farewell Tour, but has not been performed since Frehley's second exit. More recently, "Is That You?" was performed on Kiss Kruise VII in November of 2017. 

In 1999, German label Aor Heaven released Undressed – An Unmasked Tribute To Kiss, with various artists covering the entire album.

Reception

Unmasked went on sale on May 20, 1980, through Casablanca Records and reached number 35 on the Billboard 200, the worst position for the group since Hotter Than Hell in 1974. It was certified gold by the RIAA on July 30, 1980, but failed to reach platinum status. However, Unmasked topped the charts in Norway and New Zealand, and reached the top five in Australia, Austria, Germany and the Netherlands.

"Shandi", published on June 1, 1980, was the first single from the album. Although in the United States it only reached No. 47, in Argentina it reached number one. In Australia, New Zealand and Norway, it reached the top 10. "Talk to Me" was the next single outside the United States. It went on sale on August 24 and its highest position was number ten in Switzerland. "Tomorrow" was the third and last single – the second in the United States – and reached number 70 in Germany.

Unmasked received generally negative reviews from contemporary and modern critics. According to David Fricke of Rolling Stone, it "lacks the madness and amplified delusions of Love Gun and Alive!" while "Shandi" "suggests the Doobie Brothers with kabuki makeup". Fricke described songs such as "She's So European", "Easy as It Seems" and "You're All That I Want" as "disappointingly boring" and wrote that Vini Poncia's "sterile production" left "in the background the guitars and the harrowing voices of yesteryear." Jason Josephes of Pitchfork Media wrote that, until he heard it, he could not discern "how bad it was" and that he preferred to remain in ignorance for the rest of his life. Rustyn Rose of Examiner.com concluded that Unmasked "is Kiss's adaptation to the new wave movement [and] far from the classic Kiss sound." Martin Popoff described Unmasked as "a contrived mess of the most gutless and badly written tracks from the boys' middling solo albums." Stephen Thomas Erlewine of AllMusic commented that the songs are unmemorable, the group uninspired and "the music made it clear that it was time for Kiss to make a change."

Only Matthew Wilkening of Ultimate Classic Rock hailed it as "an underrated gem of power pop" and wrote that "Frehley manages to eclipse everyone by adding enough distorted guitars to bring together a sound comparable to the Rolling Stones [in] 'Two Sides of the Coin', 'Talk to Me' and the wonderfully insane 'Torpedo Girl'."

"It's a shitty album," Gene Simmons remarked of Unmasked in 1993. "I'd be ashamed to play it for [my mother] or anybody else!" "My least favourite Kiss albums are probably the disco-era ones – probably Unmasked," he said in 2004. "I took my eye off the ball and started to trust producers."

Track listing
All credits adapted from the original release.

Personnel
Kiss
Paul Stanley – vocals, rhythm guitar, lead guitar on "Shandi", guitar solo on "Is That You?" and "You're All That I Want", first guitar solo on "What Makes the World Go 'Round", all guitars & bass on "Tomorrow" and "Easy as It Seems"
Gene Simmons – vocals, bass; rhythm guitar on "You're All That I Want"
Ace Frehley – vocals, lead guitar, acoustic guitar, guitar solo on "Naked City", second guitar solo on "What Makes the World Go 'Round", all guitars & bass on "Talk to Me", "Two Sides of the Coin" and "Torpedo Girl"
Peter Criss – drums (credited, but does not play)

Additional musicians
Anton Fig – drums
Vini Poncia – keyboards, percussion, backing vocals, producer
Tom Harper – bass on "Shandi"
Holly Knight – keyboards
Bob Kulick – additional guitar

Production
Jay Messina – engineer, mixing
Gray Russell – assistant engineer
George Marino – mastering at Sterling Sound, New York

Charts

Album

Weekly charts

Year-end charts

Singles

Certifications

References

External links
 

Kiss (band) albums
1980 albums
Albums produced by Vini Poncia
Albums recorded at Record Plant (New York City)
Casablanca Records albums